Pierre Versins (born Jacques  Chamson; January 12, 1923 in Strasbourg – April 18, 2001 in Avignon) was a French Science Fiction collector and scholar. From 1957-62, he published a critical fanzine, Ailleurs.  He published four science fiction novels between 1951 and 1971, including En avant, Mars, Les etoiles ne s'en foutent pas, Leprofesseur, and Les transhumains. His ex-wife, Martine Thome, is credited on the short story "Ceux d'Argos".
Versins always specified that Thome's name appears on this particular short story because it was initially her idea ("One cent idea"), yet written entirely by Versins himself, in his personal style. 
Versins published Encyclopedie de Utopie et de la sf, which won a special award at Torcon II, the 1973 Worldcon and he won a Pilgrim Award from the Science Fiction Research Association in 1991.  In 1975, he founded the Maison d'Ailleurs, a museum of science fiction, utopia and extraordinary journey in Yverdon-les-Bains, (Switzerland). During World War II, Versins was incarcerated in Auschwitz.

External links 
Maison d'Ailleurs

1923 births
2001 deaths
French speculative fiction critics
French speculative fiction editors
French science fiction writers
Science fiction critics
French male novelists
20th-century French novelists
20th-century French male writers
French male non-fiction writers